Karl Heinrich Gräffe (7 November 1799 – 2 December 1873) was a German mathematician, who was professor at University of Zurich.

Life and work 
Gräffe's father migrated to North America, leaving the family business of jewelry in his hands. Even so, Gräffe succeeded, studying at night, entering the Carolineum of Brunswick in 1821. From 1823, he studied at the University of Göttingen with professors Gauss and Thibaut, doctorate in 1825.

In 1828 he was appointed professor of the Zurich Institute of Technology and, as of 1833, associate professor at the University of Zurich from the date of its creation. Simultaneously, also he was professor of the Obere Industrieschule.

Gräffe is known for having been the first to enunciate a method to approximate the roots of any polynomial, a method known today as the  Dandelin-Gräffe method.

References

Bibliography

External links 
 
 

1799 births
1873 deaths
19th-century German mathematicians
Scientists from Braunschweig
People from the Duchy of Brunswick
Technical University of Braunschweig alumni
University of Göttingen alumni
Academic staff of the University of Zurich